The Vishwast-class offshore patrol vessels are series of three offshore patrol vessels built by Goa Shipyard Limited, Vasco da Gama, Goa for the Indian Coast Guard.

Description 

Their features include an Integrated Bridge System (IBS), Integrated Machinery Control System (IMCS), Power Management System (PMS), High Power External Fire Fighting System (ABS Fi-Fi Class-1) and one indigenous Close Range Naval Gun (CRN-91) along with an optical fire control system. They carry one helicopter and five high speed boats. The ships are also fitted with advanced Global Maritime Distress and Safety System (GMDSS).
 
The ships are primarily designed for patrolling and policing maritime zones, search and rescue operations, maritime surveillance, anti-smuggling operations, pollution response against oil spillages and external fire-fighting.

Ships of the class

See also

References

External links
ICGS Vijit: Second 90M OPV for Indian Coast Guard Commissioned at Goa Shipyard
Coast Guard inducts patrol vessel 'ICGS Vijit' in its fleet

Patrol ship classes
Ships of the Indian Coast Guard
Indian Coast Guard